Þórbergur Þórðarson (Thórbergur Thórdarson) (Hali í Suðursveit, 12 March 1888/1889 – Reykjavík, 12 November 1974) was an Icelandic author and Esperantist.

An ironist, satirist, volatile critic, and ground-breaking achiever in experimental auto-fiction, Þórbergur arguably remains among Iceland's most beloved 20th century authors. He is considered one of the greatest Icelandic stylists of his day, with an unrivalled vocabulary and astonishing facility for written expression. Therefore he was respectfully dubbed "Maestro Þórbergur".

Þórbergur was an autodidact. As recounted in his largely autobiographical works, Íslenzkur aðall (1938) and Ofvitinn (1940), Þórbergur lived in poverty for much of his youth and early adulthood and could not afford secondary or higher education.

Quotes 
"My only wealth is philosophy."

"My only pride is wisdom."

"The underlying tone of existence is harmless humour."

"But once people have had a huge glut of progress, they'll get bored. They'll start talking to the wind and flowers and stones again and listening to the song of the stars." (from The Hymn about the Flower)

Key Years 
1888-1906   Grew up in Suðursveit.

1906-1909   Worked as a ship's cook.

1909-1913   Attended school without graduating.

1913-1918   Studied literature and philosophy at the University of Iceland but was not allowed to graduate.

1916            Began collecting Icelandic vocabulary.

1918            Delved into theosophy and yoga.

1918-1925   Worked as a teacher.

1924            His mistress gave birth to their daughter, Guðbjörg.

1925            Devotes his life to Esperanto.

1932            Married Margrét Jónsdóttir.

1921-1940   Travelled extensively in Europe.

1974            Received honorary doctorate from the University of Iceland.

Nov,12 1974 Died at Vífilsstaðir Hospital.

The 1934 trial for offending Nazis 

In January 1934, Þórbergur wrote a series of essays for the socialist daily Alþýðublaðið, titled "The Nazis' Sadistic Appetite" ("Kvalaþorsti nazista"). Iceland's public prosecutor filed charges against Þórðarson for supposedly offensive clauses in the article, one of which labelled Adolf Hitler "a sadist". The Supreme Court of Iceland agreed with the prosecutor and found the author guilty of "derogating a foreign nation". The court sentenced Þórbergur to pay a fine of 200 krónur.

English translations 

The relatively little of Þórbergur's work which has been translated into English consists mainly of fragments from his larger works. Portions of Íslenzkur aðall (1938) were published as In Search of My Beloved in 1967. In recent years, Professor Julian Meldon D'arcy has translated a fragment from Bréf til Láru (1924) as a short story, titled "When I got pregnant", as well as the first full book to appear in English translation: The Stones Speak (2012), Þórbergur's childhood memoirs, originally published as Steinarnir tala in 1956. Further translations are in progress.

Bibliography
 1912:  Nótt (Night), poem
 1915: Hálfir skósólar
 1917: Spaks manns spjarir
 1922: Hvítir hrafnar (reprint of "Hálfir skósólar" and "Spaks manns spjarir")
 1924: Bréf til  Láru (Letters to Lára)
 1938: Íslenzkur aðall (Portions published in English as "In Search of my Beloved" by Twayne Publishers, 1967)
 1940–1941: Ofvitinn (The Eccentric)
 1941: Edda (poetry by Þórbergur)
 1947: Í Suðursveit
 1945–1950: Ævisaga Árna Þórarinssonar prófasts, (memoirs of Árni Þórarinsson)
 1954–1955: Sálmurinn um blómið (The Hymn about the Flower)
 1956: Steinarnir tala (Published in English as The Stones Speak by Mál og menning, Reykjavík 2012)
 1956-1958: Trilogy about Suðursveit district
 1960: Ritgerðir 1924–1959 (essays)
 2010: In the Footsteps of a Storyteller (excerpts accompanied by photographs, Forlagið 2010)
While only major work by Þórbergur are listed above he also wrote a number of essays and other pieces on a variety of subjects, besides writing in the international language of Esperanto.

Museum

On 30 June, 2006, a museum and cultural centre was opened in Hali, Suðursveit. It is called the Þórbergssetur, and is dedicated to Þórbergur's work and life.

Notes

References
 Íslenska Alfræðiorðabókin P-Ö. 1990. Editors: Dóra Hafsteinsdóttir and Sigríður Harðardóttir. Örn og Örlygur hf., Reykjavík.

External links
 Thorbergur.is – The museum's website
 http://www.sagenhaftes-island.is/en/icelandic-literature/authors/nr/1121 – A biography

1880s births
1974 deaths
Þórbergur Þórðarson
Þórbergur Þórðarson
Þórbergur Þórðarson
Þórbergur Þórðarson
Þórbergur Þórðarson
Þórbergur Þórðarson
Þórbergur Þórðarson